Jean Le Cam (born 27 April 1959 in Quimper, Finistère) is a French sailor.

In 1981–82, he was a crewmember on Euromarché in the Whitbread Round the World Yacht Race.

Le Cam was crewman with Éric Tabarly and Michel Desjoyeaux, and won the Solitaire du Figaro in 1994, 1996, and 1999. He later took an interest in multihull ships.

He finished second in the Vendée Globe 2004-2005, arriving just a few hours after the winner Vincent Riou.

On 6 January 2009, whilst competing in the 2008-2009 edition of the Vendée Globe, he went missing 200 miles from Cape Horn. Vincent Riou, the then the skipper of PRB, rescued Jean Le Cam from his upturned IMOCA 60. Le Cam was trapped inside his upturned yacht for 16 hours during which time it was not known for certain if he was safe inside his boat or not.

On 30 November 2020, 16:15 UTC, whilst competing in the Vendée Globe 2020-2021 the roles were reversed when Le Cam conducted a nighttime rescue of fellow competitor and PRB skipper Kevin Escoffier, after Escoffier's yacht broke apart 840 miles southwest of Cape Town, Africa. Once the rescue was complete Le Cam rejoined the race, with Escoffier aboard. Escoffier was later recovered from Le Cam's, 'Yes we Cam' yacht by the French Navy on 6 December 2020. Le Cam was awarded a 16hr 15min time compensation for rescuing Kevin Escoffier. Jean Le Cam crossed the finish line on January, 28th 2021 at 19:19:55 UTC+1 in 8th place with an elapsed time of 81d 05h 59m 55s. With his time compensation added he is ranked in 4th place and a total time of 80d 13h 44m 55s. It was already his 5th participation in the Vendée Globe.

Le Cam was appointed chevalier of the French Légion d’honneur in July 2021.

Career highlights

References

External links
 
  

1959 births
Living people
Sportspeople from Quimper
French male sailors (sport)
Volvo Ocean Race sailors
IMOCA 60 class sailors
Vendée Globe finishers
French Vendee Globe sailors
2004 Vendee Globe sailors
2008 Vendee Globe sailors
2012 Vendee Globe sailors
2016 Vendee Globe sailors
2020 Vendee Globe sailors
Single-handed circumnavigating sailors